Luceafărul is a 1921 Romanian-language opera by Nicolae Bretan based on Mihai Eminescu's long love poem of the same name with text borrowed from several other poems of Eminescu's. The piece premiered in Romanian at the Romanian Opera, Cluj, on February 2, 1921; Bretan's Hungarian translation premiered thirteen days later at the Hungarian Theatre of Cluj.

Roles

Instrumentation
The piece is scored for orchestra as follows:
 2 flutes, 1 piccolo, 2 oboes, 1 English horn, 2 clarinets, 2 bassoons
 4 horns, 3 trumpets, 2 trombones, 1 bass tuba
 3 timpani, percussion
 harp
 strings

Synopsis
The opera tells the story of the evening star, who falls in love with a mortal princess. He begs God to send him to earth, despite the protestations of the other angels. The princess ultimately chooses to marry another mortal, leaving the evening star condemned to immortality.

References

1921 operas
Romanian-language operas
Operas by Nicolae Bretan
Operas